Nicola Mingazzini (born 13 August 1980) is an Italian footballer who currently plays as a midfielder for Lucchese.

Football career
Mingazzini started his career at Ravenna of Serie B. He then left for Spezia of Serie C2, and followed the team promoted to Serie C1 in summer 2000.

He then signed by Atalanta of Serie B in summer 2003. He followed the team promoted to Serie A in summer 2004. He made his Serie A debut against Juventus F.C. on 19 September 2004. After played first half of 2005/2006 Serie B season for Atalanta, Mingazzini left for Bologna.
On 12 June 2018 he will become coach of the Atalanta.

References

External links
 Profile at Gazzetta.it
 Bologna F.C. Player Profile

1980 births
People from Faenza
Living people
Italian footballers
Association football midfielders
Ravenna F.C. players
Spezia Calcio players
Atalanta B.C. players
Bologna F.C. 1909 players
U.C. AlbinoLeffe players
A.S.G. Nocerina players
Pisa S.C. players
S.S.D. Lucchese 1905 players
Serie A players
Serie B players
Serie C players
Footballers from Emilia-Romagna
Sportspeople from the Province of Ravenna